Hautes-Alpes is a department in the Provence-Alpes-Côte d'Azur region of Southeastern France. It is located in the heart of the French Alps, after which it is named. Hautes-Alpes had a population of 141,220 as of 2019, which makes it the third least populated French department. Its prefecture is Gap; its sole subprefecture is Briançon. Its INSEE and postal code is 05.

History 
Hautes-Alpes is one of the original 83 departments created during the French Revolution on 4 March 1790. It consists of the southeast of the former province of Dauphiné and the north of Provence. At the time when the department was created, the two mountain communes of La Grave and Villar-d'Arêne successfully campaigned to be included in Hautes-Alpes and not in the neighbouring department of Isère to which they had originally been assigned. This was because they hoped to benefit from the relative autonomy and certain fiscal privileges enjoyed by the region since the 14th century under the terms of the Statute of the Briançon Escartons.

Napoleon passed through Gap when he returned to reclaim France after his exile on Elba using what is now known as Route Napoléon. After Napoleon's defeat at the Battle of Waterloo, the department was occupied by Austrian and Piedmontese troops from 1815 to 1818.

During World War II, Italy occupied Hautes-Alpes from November 1942 to September 1943.

Geography 

The department is surrounded by the following French departments: Alpes-de-Haute-Provence, Drôme, Isère and Savoie. Italy borders it on the east with the Metropolitan City of Turin and the province of Cuneo, region of Piedmont.

Hautes-Alpes is located in the Alps mountain range. The average elevation is over 1000 m; the highest elevation is over 4000 m. The only three sizable cities are Gap, Briançon and Embrun, which was a subprefecture until 1926.

The third-highest settlement in all of Europe is the Hautes-Alpes village of Saint-Véran. Gap and Briançon are the highest prefecture and subprefecture in France, respectively.

The following rivers flow through the department: Durance, Guisane, Buëch, Drac and Clarée. The Durance has been dammed to create one of the largest artificial lakes in Western Europe: the Lac de Serre-Ponçon. The Queyras valley is located in the eastern part of the department and is noted by many as being an area of outstanding beauty.

Principal communes
The most populous commune is the prefecture Gap. As of 2019, there are 2 communes with more than 10,000 inhabitants, and 6 communes with more than 3,000 inhabitants:

Demographics 
The inhabitants of the department are called Haut-Alpins (masculine) and Haut-Alpines (feminine) in French.

The extremely mountainous terrain explains the sparse population, which was about 120,000 in 1791. It changed little during the 19th century, but fell to about 85,000 after World War I. Thanks in large part to tourism, the population has risen from 87,436 in 1962 to 141,107 in 2016, principally in the town of Gap.

Population development since 1791:

Politics

Departmental Council of Hautes-Alpes
The President of the Departmental Council of Hautes-Alpes has been Jean-Marie Bernard of The Republicans since the 2015 departmental elections.

Members of the National Assembly
Hautes-Alpes elected the following members of the National Assembly in the 2017 legislative election:

Tourism 
The tourist industry is largely dependent on skiing in winter. In summer the Alpine scenery and many outdoor activities attract visitors from across Europe (sailing, hiking, climbing and aerial sports such as gliding). The Tour de France passes through the department regularly. This draws many cycling fanatics to cycle the cols and watch the race.

See also
Cantons of the Hautes-Alpes department
Communes of the Hautes-Alpes department
Arrondissements of the Hautes-Alpes department

References

External links

  Prefecture website
  Departmental Council website 
  Tourist office Website
 

 
1790 establishments in France
Departments of Provence-Alpes-Côte d'Azur
States and territories established in 1790
Provence-Alpes-Côte d'Azur region articles needing translation from French Wikipedia